Vestfold Island is a small island offshore, forming the northwest entrance point to Larvik, a bay on the south coast of South Georgia. It was named by the United Kingdom Antarctic Place-Names Committee (UK-APC) in 1982, after the whaling firm A/S Vestfold, which operated the whaling ship Vestfold and a shore whaling station at the head of Stromness Harbor, from about 1920.

See also 
 List of Antarctic and sub-Antarctic islands

Islands of South Georgia